Yefimovo is a rural locality (a village) in Fominskoye Rural Settlement, Sheksninsky District, Vologda Oblast, Russia. The population was 31 as of 2002.

Geography 
Yefimovo is located 47 km southeast of Sheksna (the district's administrative centre) by road. Vorontsovo is the nearest rural locality.

References 

Rural localities in Sheksninsky District